Rock Lake is a lake in Kenora District, Ontario, Canada. It has about 5 or so cabins on it, and it is located next to Little rock lake, or as the locals call it "the second lake".

See also
List of lakes in Ontario

External links
 National Resources Canada

Lakes of Kenora District